"Broken Hearted" was the third single from Eighteen Visions self-titled album. The song was released as a radio single, with no music video as of now. The CD was not released as a single, but rather as a promo, for radio, and collectors.

Charts

Track listing
 "Broken Hearted" (3:40)

References

Eighteen Visions songs
2006 singles
2006 songs
Epic Records singles
Trustkill Records singles